The Gevarm D4 is a submachine gun that was developed in 1956 by the French company Gévarm, a subsidiary of the Gévelot cartridge company. It was used by the French police and manufactured in limited quantities.

Two Gévarm submachine guns were tested by the French Army in February 1957, one a D4 (with a retractable steel stock), and the other a D3 (with a wooden stock). The assessors report concluded that the guns were accurate and comfortable to shoot from the shoulder or hip, and had only minor faults that could be easily corrected. However, since the Army was already committed to the MAT-49, Gavram subsequently only produced between 3,000 and 4,000 D4s, most of which went to the Gendarmerie or to the Customs Service.

Users

See also
List of submachine guns
MAT-49
Sola submachine gun
Vigneron submachine gun

References

External links
 

9mm Parabellum submachine guns
Submachine guns of France
Cold War weapons of France
Infantry weapons of the Cold War